Cyril IV (Greek: Κύριλλος Δ΄), (? – 1728) was Ecumenical Patriarch 1711–1713. He was also metropolitan bishop of Cyzicus.

He was elected patriarch in 1709, but took office only after Athanasius V of Constantinople was deposed. He resigned in 1713 and remained in Istanbul until his death in 1728.

1728 deaths
18th-century Ecumenical Patriarchs of Constantinople
Bishops of Cyzicus